The 1918 The Citadel Bulldogs football team represented The Citadel Academy in the 1918 Southern Intercollegiate Athletic Association football season. Harry J. O'Brien served as coach for the third season. The Bulldogs played as members of the Southern Intercollegiate Athletic Association and played home games at College Park Stadium in Hampton Park. The 1918 season was interrupted by World War I and the Spanish flu, resulting in just a three game schedule for the Bulldogs, all taking place after Armistice Day.

Schedule

References

Citadel
The Citadel Bulldogs football seasons
College football winless seasons
Citadel Bulldogs football